Kremlinology is the study and analysis of the politics and policies of the Soviet Union while Sovietology is the study of politics and policies of both the Soviet Union and former communist states more generally. These two terms were synonymous until the dissolution of the Soviet Union. In popular culture, the term is sometimes used to mean any attempt to understand a secretive organization or process, such as plans for upcoming products or events, by interpreting indirect clues.

The founder of Kremlinology is considered to be Alexander Zinoviev. The term is named after the Kremlin, the seat of the former Soviet government. Kremlinologist refers to academic, media, and commentary experts who specialize in the study of Kremlinology. The term is sometimes sweepingly used to describe Western scholars who specialized in Russian law, although the correct term is simply Russian law scholar. Sovietologists or Kremlinologists should also be distinguished from transitologists, scholars who study legal, economic and social transitions from communism to market capitalism.

Historiography 
Academic Sovietology after World War II and during the Cold War was dominated by the "totalitarian model" of the Soviet Union, stressing the absolute nature of Joseph Stalin's power. The "totalitarian model" was first outlined in the 1950s by political scientist Carl Joachim Friedrich, who argued that the Soviet Union and other Communist states were totalitarian systems, with the personality cult and almost unlimited powers of the "great leader" such as Stalin.

The "revisionist school" beginning in the 1960s focused on relatively autonomous institutions which might influence policy at the higher level. Matt Lenoe describes the "revisionist school" as representing those who "insisted that the old image of the Soviet Union as a totalitarian state bent on world domination was oversimplified or just plain wrong. They tended to be interested in social history and to argue that the Communist Party leadership had had to adjust to social forces." These "revisionist school" historians such as J. Arch Getty and Lynne Viola challenged the "totalitarian model" approach to Soviet history and were most active in the Soviet archives.

Techniques 
During the Cold War, lack of reliable information about the country forced Western analysts to "read between the lines" and to use the tiniest tidbits, such as the removal of portraits, the rearranging of chairs, positions at the reviewing stand for parades in Red Square, the choice of capital or small initial letters in phrases such as "First Secretary", the arrangement of articles on the pages of the party newspaper Pravda and other indirect signs to try to understand what was happening in internal Soviet politics.

To study the relations between Communist fraternal states, Kremlinologists compared the statements issued by the respective national Communist parties, looking for omissions and discrepancies in the ordering of objectives. The description of state visits in the Communist press were also scrutinized, as well as the degree of hospitality lent to dignitaries. Kremlinology also emphasized ritual, in that it noticed and ascribed meaning to the unusual absence of a policy statement on a certain anniversary or holiday.

In the German language, such attempts acquired the somewhat derisive name "Kreml-Astrologie" (Kremlin Astrology), hinting at the fact that its results were often vague and inconclusive, if not outright wrong.

After the Cold War 
The term Kremlinology is still in use in application to the study of decision-making processes in the politics of the Russian Federation. In popular culture, the term is sometimes used to mean any attempt to understand a secretive organization or process, such as plans for upcoming products or events, by interpreting indirect clues.

While the Soviet Union no longer exists, other secretive states still do, such as North Korea, for which Kremlinology-like approaches are still used by the Western media. Such study is sometimes called "Pyongyangology", after the country's capital Pyongyang.

Notable Kremlinologists and Sovietologists 

 Alexander Zinoviev, the founder of Sovietology (Kremlinology)
 Anne Applebaum
 John Barron, author of The KGB Today
 Mark R. Beissinger
 Zbigniew Brzezinski
 Hélène Carrère d'Encausse
 Carey Cavanaugh
 Walter Clemens
 Stephen F. Cohen
 Robert Conquest
 Michael David-Fox
 R. W. Davies
 Evgeny Dobrenko
 Murray Feshbach
 J. Arch Getty
 Marshall Goldman
 Donald E. Graves
 Jonathan Haslam
 William G. Hyland
 George F. Kennan
 Khurshid Kasuri
 Michael Kort
 Wolfgang Leonhard
 Moshe Lewin
 William Mandel
 Jack F. Matlock Jr.
 Simon Sebag Montefiore
 Tom Nichols
 Mark Palmer
 Richard Pipes
 Condoleezza Rice
 Myron Rush
 Mark Saroyan
 Stephen Sestanovich
 Dimitri Simes
 Marshall D. Shulman
 Timothy D. Snyder
 Llewellyn Thompson, Robert F. Kennedy's Kremlinologist
 Robert C. Tucker, biographer of Joseph Stalin and former head of Princeton's Russian Studies program
 Adam Ulam, brother of Stanisław Ulam and head of the Russian Research Center at Harvard University
 Donald S. Zagoria

See also 
 Soviet Union–United States relations
 Russia–United States relations
 Team B
 Predictions of the collapse of the Soviet Union
 China watcher
 Kennan Institute
 Slavic studies
 Russian studies
 List of Russian legal historians
 List of scholars in Russian law
 Vaticanology
 Soviet and Communist studies
 Smolensk Archive

References 

Subfields of political science
Politics of the Soviet Union
Foreign relations of the Soviet Union
Cold War terminology
Russian studies